State Route 163 (SR 163), or the Cabrillo Freeway, is a state highway in San Diego, California. The  stretch of the former US 395 freeway runs from Downtown San Diego just south of an interchange with Interstate 5 (I-5), extending north through historic Balboa Park and various neighborhoods of San Diego to an interchange with I-15 in the neighborhood of Miramar. The freeway is named after Juan Rodríguez Cabrillo, the first European to navigate the coast of present-day California.

The historic section of freeway through Balboa Park south of I-8 was the first freeway in San Diego County and one of the first in California. Prior to 1964, this was the southernmost section of U.S. Route 395 (US 395), which was truncated to Hesperia when it was replaced by I-15. This section is also designated as a State Scenic Highway.

Route description

SR 163 begins in downtown San Diego at an at-grade intersection with A Street and 11th Avenue. Shortly after, the freeway has an interchange with I-5 before entering Balboa Park. This  section of SR 163 is built to parkway standards, featuring a wide, grassy median with trees, four through traffic lanes, and several very sharp curves, also passing under the Cabrillo Bridge. Shortly after leaving Balboa Park, SR 163 has an interchange with I-8 in Mission Valley. North of this interchange, SR 163 becomes a modern, Interstate-standard, eight-lane freeway. Continuing north, the freeway climbs uphill from Mission Valley to Linda Vista, where it has a partial interchange with I-805; traffic northbound on one freeway can only transfer only onto northbound of the other and southbound traffic can only transfer onto southbound direction of the other freeway. In Kearny Mesa, the freeway has a partial interchange with SR 52, one of the biggest bottlenecks in San Diego County. The freeway then heads north to and merges with I-15 near Miramar, where the southern terminus of the high-occupancy toll (HOT) lanes of I-15 are located. Ramps were built to allow traffic on SR 163 to enter and exit the express lanes of I-15.

SR 163 is part of the California Freeway and Expressway System and is part of the National Highway System, a network of highways that are considered essential to the country's economy, defense, and mobility by the Federal Highway Administration. SR 163 is eligible to be included in the State Scenic Highway System, and is designated as a scenic highway in Balboa Park by the California Department of Transportation (Caltrans), meaning that it is a substantial section of highway passing through a "memorable landscape" with no "visual intrusions", where the potential designation has gained popular favor with the community.

History

The southernmost portion of the highway, running through Balboa Park, began construction in 1942 and opened in 1948 as part of US 395; it was the first freeway in San Diego County and one of the first in California. The Cabrillo Freeway was also part of US 80 from the late 1940s until 1964. This stretch of road has been called one of America's most beautiful parkways, and was designated a California Historic Parkway in 2002.

On May 17, 1995, former US soldier and plumber Shawn Nelson stole a tank from the National Guard armory went on a destructive rampage throughout San Diego.  Driving the tank onto SR 163, Nelson disabled the tank on a traffic barrier before being shot and killed by San Diego police.

Exit list

See also

References

External links

State Route 163 from California @ AARoads.com
Caltrans: Route 163 highway conditions from Caltrans
SR 163 from California Highways

163
163
State Route 163
163
Balboa Park (San Diego)
Transportation in San Diego
U.S. Route 80
U.S. Route 395